Bhupinder Singh  (born  19 November 1970 in Taran Taran, Punjab) is a former Indian cricketer. He played domestic cricket for Punjab from 1989 to 1998 as well as India national under-19 cricket team from 1988 to 1990.

References

Punjab, India cricketers
Indian cricketers
North Zone cricketers
1970 births
Living people
People from Tarn Taran Sahib
Cricketers from Punjab, India